Stevens High School, also known as Girls High School and Stevens Elementary School, is a historic former high school building located at Lancaster, Lancaster County, Pennsylvania.  It was designed by noted Lancaster architect C. Emlen Urban and built in 1904–1905. It is a three-story, rectangular brick and brownstone building in the Second Renaissance Revival style. It has a slate covered mansard roof and terra cotta ornamentation.  The building measures 176 feet wide and 74 feet deep.  It operated as a high school until 1938, when it was designated an elementary school.  The school is named for Congressman Thaddeus Stevens (1792–1868).  It has been converted to apartments.

It was added to the National Register of Historic Places in 1983.

References

School buildings on the National Register of Historic Places in Pennsylvania
Renaissance Revival architecture in Pennsylvania
School buildings completed in 1905
Buildings and structures in Lancaster, Pennsylvania
National Register of Historic Places in Lancaster, Pennsylvania
1905 establishments in Pennsylvania